Nicholas Joseph Wise (originally Weisse; June 15, 1866 – January 26, 1923) was a professional baseball player. He appeared in one game in Major League Baseball with the Boston Beaneaters of the National League on June 20, 1888. He split the game between catcher and right field, failing to get a hit in three at bats. He also played with various teams in the New England League between 1887 and 1897.

In later life he worked as a ticket seller at Braves Field and Fenway Park. He died in Jamaica Plain, Boston on January 26, 1923.

References

External links

Major League Baseball catchers
Major League Baseball outfielders
Boston Beaneaters players
Salem Fairies players
Salem (minor league baseball) players
Pawtucket Maroons players
Brockton Shoemakers players
Pawtucket Phenoms players
Bangor Millionaires players
Fall River Indians players
Taunton Herrings players
Baseball players from Massachusetts
19th-century baseball players
1866 births
1923 deaths